Grundy County is a county located in the U.S. state of Tennessee. It is located in Middle Tennessee, bordering East Tennessee. As of 2021, the population was 13,622. Its county seat is Altamont. The county is named in honor of Felix Grundy.

History

Grundy County has a rich history and today is the home of a vast recreational wilderness known as the South Cumberland State Park which offers extensive hiking, camping, and rock climbing. Most of Grundy County is atop the Cumberland Plateau averaging a height of around 1,800 feet above sea level. Many locations in the county offer beautiful vistas and grand waterfalls. The county seat of Grundy County is Altamont, founded in the 1840s.

Thirty years before the Civil War, the resort town of Beersheba Springs was founded around a natural mineral springs near the current site of a popular wilderness area known as the Savage Gulf. Visitors to the Savage Gulf are amazed by the beautiful views and extensive hiking trails.
In the mid-1860s, the town of Gruetli-Laager was formed by an immigrant population from Switzerland. Today many of the original family names are found amongst the local population.  Today many people, on their way to Fiery Gizzard and Foster Falls, will pass through the quaint and friendly town of Tracy City. Tracy City is home to the  Grundy County Historical Society which is located in the Tennessee Consolidated Coal Company Library & Research Center and is staffed daily by many local residents who assist visitors with tours of the museum and offer assistance for genealogical research.
Near by Tracy City many visitors enjoy Grundy Lakes. The Grundy Lakes Park surrounds a series of mountain lakes and streams. The park offers swimming, picnic areas and a lengthy paved road used by runners and walkers. The lake is bordered by a honey comb of Coke Ovens that remain from when coal was mined in the area.

The county has several saltpeter mines.  Saltpeter is the main ingredient of gunpowder and was obtained by leaching the earth from several local caves.  Fultz Saltpeter Cave, located in Fultz Cove, and Hubbard Saltpeter Cave, located in Hubbard Cove, were both significant operations.  Woodlee Cave, located in Northcutts Cove, was also mined for saltpeter.  Saltpeter was mined during both the War of 1812 and the Civil War, so these caves may have been mined during either, or both, time periods.

	
In the 20th century, Grundy County earned a reputation for arson.  The business district of Tracy City was nearly destroyed when ten buildings were wiped out by an intentional blaze on April 27, 1935.  The Tracy City L&N Depot combusted after a century on August 24, 1971.  The sheriff reported 21 other fires, mostly arson, prior to that in 1971 alone.  After 86 years, James K. Shook School burned to the ground circa May 1976.  Offices of newspapers have not been spared, either.  The Grundy County Times was set ablaze in 1917, and the Herald office suffered an explosion in 1967 and was destroyed by arson in 1978.  After 105 years standing, the Grundy County Courthouse was destroyed by arson on May 3, 1990.

Some vandals appear to favor dynamite.  In the 1960s and 1970s, four dynamite blasts destroyed or damaged waterworks, another a lumber yard, and another a doctor's clinic.  Such was the problem at abandoned county schools that insurance was difficult to obtain.  Glenn Bonner, school superintendent at the time, said, "Just as soon as a building becomes vacant — boom!"

When asked about these crimes and others, Tennessee Bureau of Investigation's Bill Thompson downplayed the blazes saying, "I'm not going to say that Grundy County is any different than any other rural county. There are a ton of good people there."

Geography

Natural features
Grundy County contains much of the Fiery Gizzard Trail, renowned for scenic beauty and diversity.

Wonder Cave is located on the north side of Layne's Cove at the foot of the Cumberland Plateau.  It was discovered in 1897 by Robert A. Nelson, Melville Anderson, and Will Fitzgerald, who crawled into a small opening next to a large, well-known spring.  In 1898, the cave was purchased by R. M. Payne who enlarged the small opening, built trails, and opened the cave to the public as a commercial cave.  Wonder Cave was a major tourist attraction for nearly 80 years, but construction of the Interstate Highway system diverted tourists away from the old, main highway, Highway 41, and the cave eventually closed.

Adjacent counties
Warren County (north)
Sequatchie County (east)
Marion County (south)
Franklin County (southwest)
Coffee County (west)

State protected areas
Grundy Forest State Natural Area
Savage Gulf State Natural Area (part)
South Cumberland State Park (part)

Demographics

2020 census

As of the 2020 United States census, there were 13,529 people, 4,820 households, and 3,320 families residing in the county.

2000 census
As of the census of 2000, there were 14,332 people, 5,562 households, and 4,054 families residing in the county. The population density was 40 people per square mile (15/km2). There were 6,282 housing units at an average density of 17 per square mile (7/km2). The racial makeup of the county was 98.33% White, 0.14% Black or African American, 0.30% Native American, 0.17% Asian, 0.35% from other races, and 0.71% from two or more races. 0.98% of the population were Hispanic or Latino of any race.

There were 5,562 households, out of which 33.40% had children under the age of 18 living with them, 56.60% were married couples living together, 12.00% had a female householder with no husband present, and 27.10% were non-families. 24.00% of all households were made up of individuals, and 10.20% had someone living alone who was 65 years of age or older. The average household size was 2.54 and the average family size was 3.01.

In the county, the population was spread out, with 25.10% under the age of 18, 9.00% from 18 to 24, 27.80% from 25 to 44, 24.10% from 45 to 64, and 14.00% who were 65 years of age or older. The median age was 37 years. For every 100 females there were 96.70 males. For every 100 females age 18 and over, there were 94.30 males.

The median income for a household in the county was $22,959, and the median income for a family was $27,691. Males had a median income of $27,063 versus $17,447 for females. The per capita income for the county was $12,039. About 22.60% of families and 25.80% of the population were below the poverty line, including 31.50% of those under age 18 and 23.60% of those age 65 or over.

Communities

Cities
 Coalmont
 Gruetli-Laager

Towns
Altamont (county seat)
Beersheba Springs
Monteagle (also in Franklin and Marion Counties)
Palmer
Tracy City

Census-designated place
 Pelham

Politics

As part of Middle Tennessee, Grundy County has historically been one of the strongest Democratic counties in the state. It voted Democratic in every presidential election from 1880 to 2004, except for in 1968 (when segregationist George Wallace won the county), and 1972 when many traditional Democratic voters around the nation voted for incumbent Republican Richard Nixon. However, like most of the rural south, Grundy County has shifted towards the Republican Party in recent years, but was one of the last counties in Tennessee to make the switch to the party. The last Democratic Presidential candidate to win Grundy County was John Kerry in 2004, who won 18 out of Tennessee's 95 counties, whereas Al Gore won 36 in 2000. Grundy County was also won by Democratic U.S senate candidates Bob Clement in 2002 and Harold Ford Jr. in 2006, both of whom lost. Republican Presidential nominee John McCain won the county by nearly 13% in 2008, becoming the first Republican Presidential candidate to win Grundy County since Nixon won it 36 years earlier, and by 2016, Grundy County had taken a major shift toward the GOP, when Republican Donald Trump received 76% of the vote, a figure closer to what is usually seen in historically Republican East Tennessee counties. Four years later, he did even better in the county, getting 82% of the vote and holding the Democratic candidate to under 20% for the first time in the county's history.

Notable people
 Ernst Leonhardt was born in Tracy City in 1885 to Swiss emigrants. While living in Switzerland, he became a National Front supporter and Nazi politician and propagandist.  He died in an Allied air raid in southwestern Germany in March 1945.
 Right Rev. William Millsaps was the presiding bishop of the Episcopal Missionary Church, a former chaplain of the University of the South.
 P.R. Olgiati - 55th mayor of Chattanooga and Democratic candidate for Governor of Tennessee in 1970.

Cultural reference
Grundy County is featured in the country song Sold (The Grundy County Auction Incident) by John Michael Montgomery, as the place where the auction takes place.

See also
National Register of Historic Places listings in Grundy County, Tennessee

References

External links
 Official site
 Grundy County, TNGenWeb - free genealogy resources for the county

 
1844 establishments in Tennessee
Populated places established in 1844
Middle Tennessee
Counties of Appalachia
Second Amendment sanctuaries in Tennessee